The Chongqing–Xi'an high speed railway is a planned railway line in China. It will be part of the Baotou (Yinchuan)–Hainan corridor.

History
Work on the  section between Xi'an and Ankang began on 29 June 2021. It is expected to be completed by June 2026. Construction on the remaining section between Ankang and Chongqing is expected to begin in the second half of 2022.

Stations

Main line

Branch line
The Branch line runs from Fankuai railway station in Xuanhan County, Sichuan Province to Wanzhou North railway station in Wanzhou District, Chongqing.

References

High-speed railway lines in China
High-speed railway lines under construction